The U.S. state of Kansas first required its residents to register their vehicles and display license plates in 1913. Plates are currently issued by the Kansas Department of Revenue through its Division of Vehicles and only rear plates have been required since 1956.

Passenger baseplates

1913 to 1975
The 1955 (dated 1956) issue was the first Kansas license plate that complied with these standards.

1976 to present

Replacement plates
Most specialty Kansas license plates are available to be reissued with the same serial number at the owner's request if they become damaged or illegible over time. Since Kansas does not have a rolling replate system, this duty falls on the vehicle owner to make sure their plates are legible to law enforcement and other motorists at all times.

This process includes all Collegiate, Firefighter, EMS, Disabled, and most other specialty plates. However, they will not be reissued with an embossed serial or original designs, even if the plate holder has an older design, such as the first edition Agriculture plates. Instead, they will be issued with the most current design of the plate, and will be completely flat.

The only style of plates that are not eligible to be reissued with the same serial are the standard Ad Astra or Capitol bases. If the owner wishes to retain their standard serial number, they can request it on a personalized vanity plate.

County coding 
Kansas has a system of county codes used for identification of the home county of a state resident or company on license plates and state tax forms.

The codes are two letters based on the first letter of and another letter in the name of the county. There is no true convention for the selection of the letters; for example, Bourbon County is the only county that begins with "BO," yet its code is "BB." In most cases, but not all, as noted above, the only county that begins with two particular letters gets those letters. Exceptions are Decatur, Dickinson, Hodgeman, Leavenworth, Logan, McPherson (MC is used for Mitchell), Norton (NO is used for Neosho), Pawnee, and Pottawatomie.

The two-letter code began appearing on Kansas license plates in 1951. From 1930 to 1950, the code was a number based on the order a county ranked in terms of population based on the 1920 United States Census. From 1951 until 1988, the two letters were stamped on the license plate on the far left side, one letter on top of the other. Since then, the letters are on a sticker applied to the upper-left corner of the plate.

There is also a place on the address form of Kansas tax forms to place the county code.

Decals

Yearly Registration Decals 
- Regular Auto decals started issuance in 1976 for 1977 expirations of the redesigned 1976 standard license plate. Trucks and other non-highway vehicles using the green 1975 plates were issued 1976 decals upon expiration.

- The decal sizing was changed from square to rectangular in 1994/1995 to be able to fit a similarly sized month sticker above the registration decal.

-  The sizing was again changed in some 2012/2013 and all 2014 registrations to a square "smart sticker" that now includes the month, plate number, and registration year on one decal. Smart stickers for 2012 registrations only included new plates in OCT, NOV, & DEC registrations, and 2013 smart stickers issuance began in mid-May. Since the expiration month is now printed directly on the registration, separate month stickers were phased out and newer plates removed the sticker well that had previously been used for the decal.

^ Denotes a decal issued to non-auto, vanity or specialty plate holders.

** Denotes a redesigned standard plate with a natural expiration.

Optional plates

Personalized Vanity Plates

Educational Institution Plates
These plates share a common all-numeric serial format that started at 1 with K-State in 1997.

Organizational Distinctive Plates

Military Distinctive Plates

Other Distinctive Plates

Non-passenger plates

Motorcycle plates

References

External links
Kansas license plates, 1969–present

Transportation in Kansas
Kansas
Vehicle registration